Dacryodes rostrata is a tree in the family Burseraceae. The specific epithet  is from the Latin meaning "beaked", referring to the narrow-tipped leaves.

Description
The dark grey bark is smooth to scaly.

Distribution and habitat
Dacryodes rostrata grows widely in Vietnam and western Malesia. Its habitat is mixed dipterocarp forest from sea-level to  altitude.

References

rostrata
Trees of Vietnam
Trees of Malesia